The Boston mayoral election of 1899 occurred on Tuesday, December 12, 1899. Republican candidate and former mayor of Boston Thomas N. Hart defeated Democratic candidate Patrick Collins, and two other contenders, to become mayor for the second time. Incumbent mayor Josiah Quincy had announced in July 1899 that he would not seek re-election.

Hart benefitted from strife within the Democratic party, where John R. Murphy had lost the nomination to Collins. Murphy subsequently announced his intent to cross party lines and vote for Hart. The votes of Murphy and his followers in support of the Republican candidate contributed to Collins' defeat, and was referred to as a "knifing" in contemporary news reports.

Hart was inaugurated on Monday, January 1, 1900.

Party conventions

Democratic
The Democratic convention was held on November 20, 1899, at Bumstead Hall. Incumbent mayor Patrick Collins defeated former state senator and state representative John R. Murphy.

Republican
The Republican convention was held on November 21, 1899, at Association Hall. Former Mayor Thomas N. Hart defeated former common councilor, alderman, and state representative Alpheus Sanford.

General election

Candidates
 Patrick Collins (Democrat), former member of the United States House of Representatives (1883–1889), Massachusetts Senate (1870–1871), and Massachusetts House of Representatives (1868–1869)
 Thomas N. Hart (Republican), former Mayor of Boston (1889–1890), Postmaster of Boston (1891–1895), member of the Boston Board of Aldermen (1882–1886), and member of the Boston Common Council (1879–1881)
 John Weaver Sherman (Socialist)
 James F. Stevens (Socialist Labor)

Results

See also
List of mayors of Boston, Massachusetts

References

Further reading

External links
 Boston Mayor Race - Dec 12, 1899 at ourcampaigns.com

1899
Boston
Boston mayoral
19th century in Boston